Tipuliforma is a genus of moths of the family Crambidae. It contains only one species, Tipuliforma triangulalis, which is found in New Guinea.

References

Natural History Museum Lepidoptera genus database

Pyraustinae
Taxa named by George Hamilton Kenrick
Crambidae genera
Monotypic moth genera